Madison Middle School is a landmark school located in the northern portion of West Seattle near West Seattle High School.  Washington State assessment results in reading and math identifies Madison as a "school in improvement".  It was recognized in 2010 by the Center for Educational Effectiveness and Phi Delta Kappa – Washington State Chapter, for the third time as a School of Distinction for outstanding improvements in math and reading that put it in the top 5 percent of highest-improving schools in the state.

Facilities
In 1928 construction on what was initially called West Seattle Intermediate School began.  It opened in September 1929 as James Madison Intermediate School with 749 seventh and eighth grade students. Designed by School District architect Floyd Naramore for a capacity of 1300, the 1931 addition increased capacity to 1750 students.  A new gymnasium designed by architects Grant, Copeland, Chervenak & Associates was added south of the original building in 1973.  Seattle Public School District historic building survey in 1989 listed the school as "likely to meet landmark criteria".   Seattle's Landmark Preservation Board has since designated the school as a Landmark.

In 2005 a major redesign, restoration, and expansion was undertaken by Bassetti Architects.  The historic portion of the school was restored and new additions terracing down the hill to link to the playfield to the west. A new multi-use commons was centrally located between upper and lower classroom clusters. The original double-sided corridors were restructured to provide learning clusters of classrooms, labs, teacher planning offices and open flexible areas to support grade-based teams. A roof-top deck allows students to spill out from the Commons onto a structured outdoor play area.  Ground-source heat pumps were installed under the playfield to provide a low-energy source for the building's heating and cooling.

References

External links

 Seattle Public Schools
 Seattle Schools - school information
  History of Madison Middle School
 Greatschools.org
 Center for Educational Effectiveness
 Great Schools 2009
 Seattle Landmarks
 List of landmarks in Seattle

Landmarks in Seattle
Seattle Public Schools
Middle schools in Seattle
Public middle schools in Washington (state)